Donald Ziegler may refer to:

 Donald Emil Ziegler (1936–2019), American judge in Pennsylvania
 Donald N. Ziegler (born 1949), American politician in Minnesota